Awakenings is an opera in two acts composed by Tobias Picker, with a libretto by Aryeh Lev Stollman. Based on Awakenings, Oliver Sacks' 1960's chronicle of his efforts to help the victims of an encephalitis epidemic, the opera was commissioned by the Opera Theatre of Saint Louis, and premiered on June 5th, 2022. The East Coast premiere of Awakenings was performed by Odyssey Opera in partnership with Boston Modern Orchestra Project, conducted by Gil Rose and directed by James Robinson, on February 25, 2023 at the newly renovated Huntington Theater.

Roles

Development 

Picker originally met Oliver Sacks at a dinner party.  Picker, whose Tourette's syndrome went undiagnosed until he was in his thirties, was interested in Sacks's opinion of his symptoms. Soon becoming close friends, Picker and Sacks served as mutual inspirations for one another: Picker was interested in Sacks's intellect and compassion, while Sacks was fascinated by Picker's creativity, Tourette's, and musicianship. Picker would become one of the subjects of Sack’s book Musicophilia: Tales of Music and the Brain:
{{blockquote|Tobias Picker, the distinguished composer, also has Tourette’s. but when he is composing or playing the piano or conducting, his tics disappear. I have watched him as he sits almost motionless for hours, orchestrating one of his études for piano at his computer… Picker writes in every mode—the dreamy and tranquil no less than the violent and stormy—and moves from one mood to another with consummate ease.<ref>Musicophilia: Tales of Music and the Brain (2007) </ref>}}
In 2010, Picker composed a ballet, Awakenings, for the Rambert Dance Company, inspired by the book by Oliver Sacks. Later in the decade, Picker and his husband, the novelist and neurologist Aryeh Lev Stollman, began to develop an opera based upon Awakenings''.

References

External links 
 Opera Theatre of Saint Louis, 
 Tobias Picker 

Operas by Tobias Picker
English-language operas
2022 operas
Operas set in the United States
Operas
Operas set in the 20th century